Kevin Bruce Stanfield (born December 19, 1955) is an American former professional baseball pitcher who played for the Minnesota Twins in 1979.

Stanfield attended San Gorgonio High School in San Bernardino, California and played college baseball at San Bernardino Valley College in 1975 and 1976. He began his professional career with the Minnesota Twins and became known as one of the best prospects in their farm system. In August 1979, with Twins owner Clark Griffith in attendance, Stanfield threw a three-hit complete game for the Triple-A Toledo Mud Hens. He was promoted to the Twins within the week.

He made a successful Major League debut with the Twins on September 14, 1979, retiring the only batter he faced in relief of Dave Goltz.

Due to arm injuries, his final pitching appearance of the 1979 season would also be his final professional baseball game at any level. He underwent an unsuccessful surgery in December 1980 and ultimately retired before the start of the 1982 season.

References

External links

1955 births
Living people
Baseball players from South Dakota
People from Huron, South Dakota
Minnesota Twins players
Elizabethton Twins players
Toledo Mud Hens players
Visalia Oaks players
Wisconsin Rapids Twins players
SBVC Wolverines baseball players